Pleasant Hill is an unincorporated community and census-designated place (CDP) in Lebanon County, Pennsylvania, United States. The population was 2,643 at the 2010 census, up from 2,301 at the 2000 census.

Geography
Pleasant Hill is located in central Lebanon County at  (40.336082, -76.444248). It is bordered to the east and southeast by the city of Lebanon, the county seat, and to the west by the borough of Cleona. Pleasant Hill is in parts of three townships: the western end is in North Lebanon Township, the northeast part is in West Lebanon Township, and the majority of the community is in North Cornwall Township.

U.S. Route 422 (West Cumberland Avenue) is the main road through Pleasant Hill; it leads east through Lebanon  to Reading and west-southwest  to Hershey.

Quittapahilla Creek flows through the center of the community, leading west to Swatara Creek, a tributary of the Susquehanna River.

Demographics

As of the 2010 United States Census, there were 2,643 people living in the CDP. The racial makeup of the CDP was 68.8% White, 5.0% Black, 0.3% Native American, 2.9% Asian, 0.2% from some other race and 1.3% from two or more races. 21.6% were Hispanic or Latino of any race.

References

Census-designated places in Lebanon County, Pennsylvania
Census-designated places in Pennsylvania